= Kampung Pantai =

Kampung Pantai is a village in Federal Territory of Labuan, Malaysia.
